Verducci is a surname. Notable people with the surname include:

Joe Verducci (1910–1964), American football player and coach and college athletics administrator
Tom Verducci (born 1960), American sportswriter

See also
Verduci